This is a list of yearly Big Ten Conference football champions. Co-champions are listed in alphabetical order.

Champions by year

Note: an asterisk (*) denotes a national championship for that season recognized by the College Football Data Warehouse.

^ Ohio State vacated all wins from the 2010 season and its share of the championship due to NCAA violations.

Championships by team

Keys
 Italics indicate a school no longer competing in the Big Ten.
 Bold indicates an outright conference championship.

Notes

Championships by head coach

^ Ohio State vacated all wins from the 2010 season and their share of the championship

See also
 List of Big Ten Conference football standings (1896–1958)
 List of Big Ten Conference football standings (1959–present)

References

Big Ten Conference
Champions